To Melody a Soul Responds is a 1915 short film produced by American Film Manufacturing Company, released by Mutual Film and directed by  B. Reeves Eason.

Cast
 Ashton Dearholt as Edler
 Joseph Galbraith as Krieg, the Master Violinist
 Jack Richardson as Dehof, a pianist
 Vivian Rich as Elsa Krieg, the daughter
 William Spencer

External links

1915 films
1915 short films
American silent short films
American black-and-white films
Films directed by B. Reeves Eason
1910s American films